Kaye A. de Ruiz is a mathematician and educator who has spent the majority of her career teaching calculus and statistics at the United States Air Force Academy.

Education 
De Ruiz received her Bachelor of Science degree from Southern Oregon College and a Master of Science degree from Oregon State University. While working at the Air Force Academy faculty as an instructor, she completed a Ph.D. in applied statistics at the University of California, Riverside in 1990; her dissertation, A Mathematical Model for a Paired Comparison Experiment on a Continuum of Response, was jointly supervised by 
Robert J. Beaver and Barry Arnold.

Teaching career 
De Ruiz held her first teaching position at Roseburg High School in Roseburg, Oregon, where she focused on connecting mathematical concepts to their practical uses by inviting local professionals into her classroom. She also taught adult classes at the Misawa Air Force Base in Japan and, beginning in 1982, began teaching at the United States Air Force Academy, serving as the course director for the differential calculus course at the Academy. She also taught several courses in statistics while at the Academy, maintaining her emphasis on how students can apply the mathematics to solve problems encountered outside of the classroom. De Ruiz spent some time as the chief of the statistics division at the Academy as well.

Louise Hay Award 
De Ruiz was the 1994 recipient of the Louise Hay Award by the Association for Women in Mathematics for her contributions to mathematics education.

References

Living people
Year of birth missing (living people)
20th-century American mathematicians
21st-century American mathematicians
American women mathematicians
Mathematics educators
Southern Oregon University alumni
Oregon State University alumni
University of California, Riverside alumni
United States Air Force Academy faculty
20th-century American women
21st-century American women